Reginald Mohun or Mone (1507/8 – 22 April 1567), of Hall in the parish of Lanteglos-by-Fowey and of Bodinnick, both in Cornwall, was an English politician.

He was a Member (MP) of the Parliament of England for Newport, Cornwall in 1547, Plympton Erle in October 1553, Helston in November 1554, Rye in 1555 and Liskeard in 1559 and 1563.

References

1500s births
Year of birth missing
1567 deaths
Members of the Parliament of England for Plympton Erle
English MPs 1547–1552
English MPs 1553 (Mary I)
English MPs 1554–1555
English MPs 1555
English MPs 1563–1567
Members of the pre-1707 English Parliament for constituencies in Cornwall
High Sheriffs of Cornwall